Richard F. MacPherson (November 4, 1930 – August 8, 2017) or Coach Mac was an American football coach.  He served as the head coach at the University of Massachusetts Amherst from 1971 to 1977 and at Syracuse University from 1981 to 1990, compiling a career college football record of 111–73–5.  MacPherson was the head coach of the National Football League's New England Patriots from 1991 to 1992, tallying a mark of 8–24.  He was inducted into the College Football Hall of Fame as a coach in 2009.

Early life
MacPherson was born on Nov. 4, 1930, in Old Town, Maine, the second youngest of 12 children. At Old Town High School, he played high school football, basketball and baseball and graduated in 1948. He enrolled at Maine Maritime Academy and then served in the U.S. Air Force from 1950-54 during the Korean War. 

MacPherson returned to school at Springfield College (Mass.), where he earned his bachelor’s degree in 1958. He was a center and linebacker on the football team, a member of the Chiefs’ undefeated 1956 squad and served as team captain as a senior. It was at Springfield that he met his future wife, the former Sandra Jean Moffitt, when both were sophomores. His alma mater awarded him with induction into the Springfield College Athletic Hall of Fame in 1988, and he earned entry into the State of Maine Sports Hall of Fame in 1985.

Coaching career
MacPherson’s first coaching stop was at University of Illinois where he was a graduate assistant coach with the freshman team while working on his master’s degree. He moved on to University of Massachusetts as freshman coach for two years and then took an assistant’s post at University of Cincinnati under Coach Chuck Studley.

Lou Saban hired MacPherson at University of Maryland in 1966 and then, when the Denver Broncos selected Saban as head coach, he brought MacPherson with him to coach defense. 

Named head coach at UMass in 1971, MacPherson led the Minutemen to four Yankee Conference titles in seven years. During that span, he twice claimed New England Football Coach of the Year honors. His 45 victories at Massachusetts rank him third all-time in school history, and his 28-8-1 mark in Yankee Conference games notches a .778 winning percentage, which places him fifth in league history. The first UMass coach to win eight or more games in three different seasons, his nine-win campaign in 1972 tied the school record for single- season victories first set in 1901. 

He returned to the NFL as an assistant coach on the staff of Sam Rutigliano with the Cleveland Browns from 1978-80.

Syracuse University
MacPherson was hired as the 25th head coach at Syracuse University by then-athletics director Jake Crouthamel. Syracuse had made just one bowl appearance in the previous 14 years when Crouthamel turned to MacPherson, who he had worked against while the head coach at Dartmouth. 

MacPherson's record at Syracuse was 66–46–4 and included an undefeated season in 1987, when his team finished 11–0–1 and tied Auburn in the 1988 Sugar Bowl.  After the 1990 season he left Syracuse to become head coach of the New England Patriots and was replaced by assistant Paul Pasqualoni.  MacPherson coached the New England Patriots from 1991 to 1992 and received strong consideration for Coach of the Year honors in 1991, turning around a team that went 1–15 in 1990 and leading them to a 6–10 record in his first season. However, in his second season the team started four different quarterbacks and went 2–14.  MacPherson was subsequently fired at the end of the season.

During his tenure at Syracuse, MacPherson put together some of the most talented coaching staffs in the country. He employed and mentored future college head coaches Gary Blackney (Bowling Green), Randy Edsall (Connecticut, Maryland), Jim Hofher (Cornell, Buffalo), Bill Maxwell (Hobart), George O’Leary (Georgia Tech, Central Florida), Paul Pasqualoni (Syracuse, Connecticut) and  Hall of Famer Jim Tressel (Youngstown State, Ohio State).

MacPherson coached two Hall of Famers at Syracuse: defensive tackle Tim Green (1982-85) and quarterback Don McPherson (1983-87). He also coached two NFF National Scholar-Athletes: Anthony Romano in 1983 and Green in 1985.

Later life
Following his retirement from coaching, MacPherson moved to the broadcast booth, working for BIG EAST TV. He was also a radio analyst for Syracuse football games, first on game-day coverage for local station WSYR and later as part of the program’s official radio network. He teamed with Dave Pasch, the voice of the Arizona Cardinals and college football and basketball on ESPN, as well as current Voice of the Orange Matt Park. 

He was honored as the Grand Marshal at the 28th Annual Syracuse St. Patrick's Parade in 2010.

MacPherson died surrounded by his family at the Crouse Hospital in Syracuse, New York, on August 8, 2017, at the age of 86.

At the time of his death, he was survived by his wife, Sandra, his daughters, Maureen MacPherson and Janet Sweeney, son-in-law Greg Sweeney, and four grandchildren (Macky MacPherson, Cameron MacPherson, Suzy MacPherson and Molly Sweeney). His grandsons, Macky and Cameron, were both semifinalists for the NFF William V. Campbell Trophy while playing football at Syracuse, and Macky was a graduate assistant coach with the Orange.

Head coaching record

College

NFL

References

External links
 
 Dick MacPherson at Pro-Football-Reference.com
 

1930 births
2017 deaths
American football centers
American football linebackers
Cincinnati Bearcats football coaches
Illinois Fighting Illini football coaches
Maryland Terrapins football coaches
Syracuse Orange football coaches
UMass Minutemen football coaches
Cleveland Browns coaches
Denver Broncos coaches
New England Patriots head coaches
New England Patriots coaches
Springfield Pride football players
College Football Hall of Fame inductees
People from Old Town, Maine
Coaches of American football from Maine
Players of American football from Maine